Boko may refer to:

Languages
 Boko alphabet, a Latin alphabet used for the Hausa language
 Boko language, a language of Benin and Nigeria
 Boko (Iboko) language, part of the Bala language, a Bantu language in the Democratic Republic of Congo

Places
 Boko, Burkina Faso, a town in Burkina Faso
 Boko District, in the Pool Region, Republic of the Congo
 Boko-Songho, district in Bouenza, Republic of the Congo
 Boko, Kamrup, a town in South Kamrup district of Assam, India
 Boko (Vidhan Sabha constituency), Assam
Boko, Senegal, a village in the Bignona Department of Senegal

Other
 Boko (Final Fantasy) or Boco, a fictional character in the video game series Final Fantasy
 Boko Haram, a terrorist group in West Africa
 Boko the Bobcat, a mascot of the athletic teams of Texas State University

See also 
 Boco (disambiguation)